Dry Brook Ridge is a ridge located in the Catskill Mountains of New York southeast of Margaretville. Pakatakan Mountain is located northwest of Dry Brook Ridge.

References

Mountains of Delaware County, New York
Mountains of New York (state)
Mountains of Ulster County, New York